is a Tokimeki Memorial themed Taisen Puzzle-Dama spin-off game. It is followed by its sequel Tokimeki Memorial 2 Puzzle-Dama. It was re-released in Japan on the PlayStation Store on January 13, 2010.

Reception 
In Japan, Game Machine listed Tokimeki Memorial Taisen Puzzle-Dama on their February 1, 1996 issue as being the twelfth most-successful arcade game of the month.

References 

Arcade video games
PlayStation (console) games
Sega Saturn games
Windows games
PlayStation Network games
Puzzle video games
1995 video games
Konami games
Japan-exclusive video games
Tokimeki Memorial
Video games featuring female protagonists
Video games scored by Yuji Takenouchi
Video games developed in Japan